Gerald Eugene Wilkerson (born October 21, 1939) is an American prelate of the Roman Catholic Church.  He served as an auxiliary bishop of the Archdiocese of Los Angeles from 1997 to 2015 and as apostolic administrator for the Diocese of Monterey for six months in 2018 and 2019.

Biography

Early life 
Gerald Wilkerson was born on October 21, 1939, in Des Moines, Iowa.  His family later moved to Long Beach, California. He attended St. John’s Seminary in Camarillo, California.

Wilkerson was ordained a priest for the Archdiocese of Los Angeles on January 5, 1965, by Cardinal James McIntyre. After his ordination, Wilkerson served as associate pastor at three Southern California parishes:

 Our Lady of Guadalupe in La Habra 
 St. Michael in Los Angeles
 American Martyrs in Manhattan Beach

Wilkerson then was posted for 15 years at Our Lady of Grace Parish in Encino, California, as administrator and then pastor.

Auxiliary Bishop of Los Angeles 
On November 5, 1997, Pope John Paul II appointed Wilkerson as the titular bishop of Vincennes and as an auxiliary bishop of the Archdiocese of Los Angeles. He was consecrated on January 21, 1998. Cardinal Roger Mahony was his principal consecrator, while Bishop Michael Driscoll and Bishop Joseph M. Sartoris were his principal co-consecrators.

Wilkerson led the archdiocese's San Fernando Pastoral Region with 54 parishes, 12 high schools, two hospitals, and five missions.

Retirement 
On July 21, 2015, Pope Francis accepted Wilkerson's letter of retirement as auxiliary bishop of the Archdiocese of Los Angeles, sent because Wilkerson had reached the retirement age of 75 for bishops.

On July 20, 2018, Pope Frances appointed Wilkerson as the apostolic administrator for the Diocese of Monterey after the death of Bishop Richard Garcia. On December 19, 2018, Wilkerson announced that the diocese was hiring an outside law firm to examine its personal records for any credible allegations of sexual abuse by clergy. Wilkerson left the apostolic administrator position on January 29, 2019, after the installation of Bishop Daniel E Garcia as the new bishop of Monterey

See also
 

 Catholic Church hierarchy
 Catholic Church in the United States
 Historical list of the Catholic bishops of the United States
 List of Catholic bishops of the United States
 Lists of patriarchs, archbishops, and bishops

References

External links
Roman Catholic Archdiocese of Los Angeles Website
United States Conference of Catholic Bishops News Release

Episcopal succession

21st-century American Roman Catholic titular bishops
Roman Catholic Archdiocese of Los Angeles
Clergy from Des Moines, Iowa
People from Long Beach, California
1939 births
Living people
20th-century American Roman Catholic titular bishops
Catholics from California
Catholics from Iowa